East Side - West Side is a 1923 American silent drama film. Directed by Irving Cummings, the film stars Kenneth Harlan, Eileen Percy, and Maxine Elliott Hicks. It was released on June 1, 1923.

Cast list
 Kenneth Harlan as Duncan Van Norman
 Eileen Percy as Lory James
 Maxine Elliott Hicks as Kit Lamson
 Lucille Hutton as Eunice Potter
 Lucille Ward as Mrs. Cornelia Van Norman
 John T. Prince as Paget
 Betty May as Amy Van Norman
 Charles Hill Mailes as Dr. Ernest Shepley
 Wally Van as Skiddy Stillman

References

External links

American silent feature films
American black-and-white films
Silent American drama films
Films directed by Irving Cummings
1923 drama films
1923 films
1920s American films